Blayre Turnbull (born July 15, 1993) is a Canadian ice hockey player for the PWHPA. She made her debut with the Canada women's national ice hockey team at the 2014 4 Nations Cup.

Career
Turnbull attended Shattuck-St. Mary's, where she was a classmate of Nathan MacKinnon and played on the girls' hockey team. As a junior, she appeared in 52 contests while gaining 60 points (on 30 goals and 30 assists). With the team, won two national championships in two years.

NCAA 
The 2011–12 Wisconsin Badgers season marked her first with the club. In a match versus the Lindenwood Lady Lions on September 25, 2011, she scored her first career NCAA goal. She holds various UW records and the NCAA record for shorthanded goals in a season. She was the captain of the Wisconsin Badgers in her junior and senior year and is an NCAA champion. She played for the Badgers for a total of four seasons, identifying herself in her Twitter account as having graduated in 2015.

CWHL 
Turnbull helped the Calgary Inferno capture their first-ever Clarkson Cup championship in 2016. Contested at Ottawa's Canadian Tire Centre, she scored twice in an 8–3 victory over Les Canadiennes de Montreal.

She would miss most of the 2017-18 CWHL season training with Team Canada for the Olympics but returned in time for the playoffs. In 2019, Turnbull would win her second Clarkson Cup with Calgary.

In May 2019, Turnbull joined the PWHPA after the collapse of the CWHL. She participated in the 2020 NHL All-Star Game with the Canadian All-Stars.

International 
She participated with Team Atlantic (alongside teammates such as Jillian Saulnier and Alex Normore) at the 2009 Canadian Under 19 nationals. She participated in the shootout for Team Atlantic in the quarterfinals versus Team Ontario Blue in a losing effort. On two occasions, she attended training camp for the 2010 and 2011 IIHF World Women's under-18. For the 2011 camp, Turnbull was one of only two Nova Scotians who were invited. In 2016, she made the Canadian National Women's team and competed in the world championships in Kamloops, BC. She also played for Canada in the 2017 and 2019 World Championships and was selected for the 2020 World Championships before they were cancelled due to the 2019-20 coronavirus outbreak.

Turnbull was selected to the Canadian roster for the 2018 Winter Olympics in Korea. She would put up 3 points in 5 games, winning a silver medal.

In 2021, Turnbull played for Canada at the 2021 IIHF Women's World Championship, and suffered a broken fibula during the celebration after winning the gold medal.

On January 11, 2022, Turnbull was named to Canada's 2022 Olympic team. The team won the gold medal, defeating the United States in the final 3–2.

Personal life 

Turnbull has a Bachelor of Arts degree in legal studies. Her brother Brent played for the Québec Remparts in the QMJHL.

Career Statistics

Awards and honours
Blayre Turnbull, WCHA Rookie of the Week (Week of October 5, 2011)
2012 Wisconsin Badgers Rookie of the Year

References

External links

1993 births
Canadian expatriate ice hockey players in the United States
Canadian women's ice hockey forwards
Calgary Inferno players
Clarkson Cup champions
Ice hockey people from Nova Scotia
Ice hockey players at the 2018 Winter Olympics
Ice hockey players at the 2022 Winter Olympics
Living people
Medalists at the 2018 Winter Olympics
Medalists at the 2022 Winter Olympics
Olympic ice hockey players of Canada
Olympic medalists in ice hockey
Olympic gold medalists for Canada
Olympic silver medalists for Canada
People from Pictou County
Wisconsin Badgers women's ice hockey players
Professional Women's Hockey Players Association players